NGC 206 is a bright star cloud in the Andromeda Galaxy. It is notable for being the brightest star cloud in Andromeda as viewed from Earth.

Features
NGC 206 is the richest and most conspicuous star cloud in the Andromeda Galaxy as well as one of the largest and brightest star formation regions of the Local Group. It contains more than 300 stars brighter than Mb=−3.6. It was originally identified by Edwin Hubble as a star cluster but today, due to its size, it is classified as an OB association.

NGC 206 is located in a spiral arm of the Andromeda Galaxy, in a zone free of neutral hydrogen and has a double structure, with one region that has an age of around 10 million years and includes several H II regions in one of its borders and other with an age of between 40 million years and 50 million years that includes a number of cepheids. Both parts are separated by a band of interstellar dust and include hundreds of stars of spectral type O and B.

See also

 List of Andromeda's satellite galaxies

References

External links 

 NGC 206 @ SEDS NGC objects pages
 
 

Star clouds
Andromeda Galaxy
Andromeda (constellation)
0206